"Ven Junto a Mi" ("Come Next to Me") is a written and performed by Mexican singer Claudio Bermúdez on his 1994 debut album Como Aire Fresco The album marked his career as a soloist following his departure from Timbiriche in 1991. It was produced by Spanish composer Rafael Pérez-Botija and released as a single in 1994. The song became a number one hit on the Billboard Latin Pop Airplay chart in 1995 where it spent seven weeks on top of the chart. It was recognized as one of best-performing songs of the year at the 1996 ASCAP Latin Awards. Despite its success, it became his only number one song on the chart and Bermúdez later became a composer and record producer for other artists. The song has been covered by Victor Roque y su Gran Manzana, Johnny Rivera,  and Encadenado.

Charts

Weekly charts

Year-end charts

See also
List of number-one Billboard Latin Pop Airplay songs of 1995

References

Claudio Bermúdez songs
1994 debut singles
1994 songs
Rodven Records singles
1990s ballads
Pop ballads
Spanish-language songs